Albrecht Glockendon the Elder (c. 1432, Nuremberg1474. Also spelled Albert Glockenton) was a German engraver and manuscript illuminator. He studied under Rogier van der Weyden, and was also influenced by Martin Schongauer. His descendants made up the large and active Glockendon family of artists.

References
Dictionary of Painters and Engravers, by Michael Bryan, Robert Edmund Graves, Walter Armstrong Entry on Albrecht Glockendon the Elder
Entry for Albrecht Glockendon the Elder on the Union List of Artist Names

1430s births
1474 deaths
German engravers
Manuscript illuminators